West River Station is a community in the Canadian province of Nova Scotia, located in Pictou County.

References

West River Station at Geographical Names Board of Canada

Communities in Pictou County
General Service Areas in Nova Scotia
Railway stations in Nova Scotia